Stage fright or performance anxiety is the anxiety, fear, or persistent phobia which may be aroused in an individual by the requirement to perform in front of an audience, real or imagined, whether actually or potentially (for example, when performing before a camera). Performing in front of an unknown audience can cause significantly more anxiety than performing in front of familiar faces. In some cases, the person will suffer no such fright from this, while they might suffer from not knowing who they're performing to. In some cases stage fright may be a part of a larger pattern of social phobia (social anxiety disorder), but many people experience stage fright without any wider problems. Quite often, stage fright arises in a mere anticipation of a performance, often a long time ahead. It has numerous manifestations: stuttering, tachycardia, tremor in the hands and legs, sweaty hands, facial nerve tics, dry mouth, and dizziness.

People and situations
Stage fright can occur in people of all experiences and backgrounds, from those who are completely new to being in front of an audience to those who have done so for years. It is commonly recognized in the population. Stage fright may, for example, have a negative impact on the individual's performance, such that it affects their confidence during job interviews, presentations, etc. It also affects athletes, teachers, actors, comedians, musicians, and politicians. Many people with no other problems in communication can experience stage fright, but some people with chronic stage fright also have social anxiety or social phobia which are chronic feelings of high anxiety in any social situation. Stage fright can also be seen in school situations, like stand up projects and class speeches.

Effects
When someone starts to feel the sensation of being scared or nervous they start to experience anxiety. According to a Harvard Mental Health Letter, "Anxiety usually has physical symptoms that may include a racing heart, a dry mouth, a shaky voice, blushing, trembling, sweating, lightheadedness, and nausea". It triggers the body to activate its sympathetic nervous system. This process takes place when the body releases adrenaline into the blood stream causing a chain of reactions to occur. This bodily response is known as the "fight or flight" syndrome, a naturally occurring process in the body done to protect itself from harm. "The neck muscles contract, bringing the head down and shoulders up, while the back muscles draw the spine into a concave curve. This, in turn, pushes the pelvis forward and pulls the genitals up, slumping the body into a classic fetal position".

In trying to resist this position, the body will begin to shake in places such as the legs and hands. Several other things happen besides this. Muscles in the body contract, causing them to be tense and ready to attack. Second, "blood vessels in the extremities constrict". This can leave a person with the feeling of cold fingers, toes, nose, and ears. Constricted blood vessels also gives the body extra blood flow to the vital organs.

Treatment
Propranolol is occasionally prescribed off-label to treat performance anxiety. As a beta-blocker drug, Propranolol prevents the adrenaline released from the "fight or flight" bodily response from attaching to the heart, lungs and other parts of the body. This reduces or eliminates the physical symptoms of performance anxiety including increased heart rate (tachycardia), rapid breathing (hyperventilation), dry mouth, trembling, shaky voice, and sweating. Propranolol is not an officially approved treatment for performance anxiety; however, past studies and patient experiences indicate the drug is effective at reducing the physical symptoms. Propranolol does not help with the mental symptoms of anxiety including the emotional feeling of nervousness since the drug does not alter the neurochemistry of the brain unlike typical medications prescribed for other forms of anxiety such as anti-depressants.

There are also ways to treat performance anxiety without the use of medication. Relaxing the body with deep breaths, mentally preparing oneself, and redirecting one's attention are techniques that may help with minimizing stage fright. Although it is a common assumption that alcohol can be used to calm nerves, other forms of treatment prove to be much better at treating stage fright. Alcohol consumption may actually affect one's performance and lead to lapses in memory and overall absentmindedness.

Famous people

Many well-known public performers have been afflicted with stage fright and were able to overcome their problem, including Al Jolson, Lily Pons, Brian Wilson, Virginia O'Brien, Michael Gambon, Lorde, Jason Alexander, Mose Allison, Maya Angelou, David Brenner, Peter Coyote, Olympia Dukakis, Richard Lewis, Roy Orbison, Barbra Streisand, Adele, David Warner, Niall Horan, Frankie Howerd, Mike Yarwood, Ian Holm, Lady Gaga, Mariah Carey, Frankie Boyle, Peter Gabriel, Donald Fagen, John Lydon, Meg White (which was so extreme that it led to her early retirement from the music industry) and Amanda Seyfried.

In some cases, famous stars have struggled to cope with their anxiety. Hugh Grant said on starring in the 2007 film Music and Lyrics that he "did the whole film full of lorazepam."

Not every performer suffers from stage fright. Ethel Merman said:

See also
 Camera shyness
 Counterphobic attitude
 Glossophobia
 Test anxiety

References
Notes

Sources

Further reading
 
 
 
 
 

Anxiety disorders
Stagecraft